Karel Čurda (10 October 1911 in Stará Hlína, today part of Třeboň – 29 April 1947 in Prague) was a Czech Nazi collaborator during World War II.

Wartime activities
A soldier of the Czechoslovak army in exile, Čurda was parachuted into the protectorate in 1942 as a member of the sabotage group Out Distance. Later that year, he betrayed the Czechoslovak army agents responsible for the assassination of top Nazi official Reinhard Heydrich in Prague. His reward was 10,000,000 Kronen or 1 million Reichsmarks and a new identity, "Karl Jerhot". He married a German woman and spent the rest of the war as a Gestapo collaborator.

Execution
After the war, Čurda was tracked down and arrested. When asked in court how he could betray his comrades, Čurda reportedly answered, "I think you would have done the same for 1 million marks." Čurda was found guilty of treason and hanged on 29 April 1947.

Alternative theory
Modern Czech historian Jiří Plachý gave a different account of his personality and motives. According to research, Čurda stayed with his family in South Bohemia in the immediate aftermath of the assassination. That put him under huge pressure as he knew the Nazis could wipe out his whole family or village, just as they had wiped out Lidice and Ležáky. It is posited that this was the key factor in his actions.

Čurda in film and fiction
In the film Operation Daybreak (1975), Čurda is portrayed by Martin Shaw. In Anthropoid (2016), he was portrayed by Jiří Šimek. In The Man with the Iron Heart (2017), he was portrayed by Adam Nagaitis.

See also
Operation Anthropoid

References

1911 births
1947 deaths
Czech resistance members
Czechoslovak soldiers
Czechoslovak military personnel of World War II
Executed Czechoslovak collaborators with Nazi Germany
Executed Czech people
Gestapo agents
Operation Anthropoid
People executed by Czechoslovakia by hanging
People executed by the Third Republic of Czechoslovakia
People from Třeboň
People from the Kingdom of Bohemia